The Korean Air Lines YS-11 hijacking occurred on 11 December 1969. The aircraft, a Korean Air Lines NAMC YS-11 flying a domestic route from Gangneung Airbase in Gangneung, Gangwon, South Korea to Gimpo International Airport in Seoul, was hijacked at 12:25 PM by North Korean agent Cho Ch'ang-hŭi. It was carrying four crewmembers and 46 passengers (excluding Cho); 39 of the passengers were returned two months later, but the crew and seven passengers remain in North Korea. The incident is seen in the South as an example of the North Korean abductions of South Koreans.

Incident
According to passenger testimony, one of the passengers rose from his seat 10 minutes after takeoff and entered the cockpit, following which the aircraft changed direction and was joined by three Korean People's Air Force fighter jets. The aircraft landed at Sǒndǒk Airfield near Wonsan at 1:18 pm. North Korean soldiers boarded the aircraft afterwards, blindfolded the passengers, and instructed them to disembark. The aircraft was damaged beyond repair on landing. A member of the United States Air Force in South Korea was scheduled to be a passenger on the ill-fated flight, but instead caught a military transport flight at the last minute.

North Korea claimed that the pilots had flown the aircraft there to protest the policies of then-President of South Korea Park Chung-hee. The passengers were subjected to attempts at indoctrination for up to four hours a day. The South Korean police initially suspected that the co-pilot conspired with two North Korean agents in the hijacking. The night after the hijacking, 100,000 South Koreans held a mass rally in freezing weather to protest about the hijacking, and burned an effigy of Kim Il-sung.

On 25 December, North Korea proposed to hold talks on the matter. Talks were finally held in late January 1970. Sixty-six days after the incident, North Korea released 39 of the passengers on 14 February through the Joint Security Area at Panmunjom, but kept the aircraft, crew, and remaining passengers. The statements provided by the released passengers refuted North Korea's claims that the hijacking was led by the pilots; instead, they pinned the blame on one of the passengers. One man claimed to have looked out the window of the aircraft despite instructions from the North Korean guards, and saw the hijacker being driven away in a black sedan. Another passenger was reported to have become mentally deranged as a result of his captivity, and lost the ability to speak.

Aftermath
The fate of most of the unreturned passengers has not been confirmed. They were educated, upper-class people; Song Yeong-in formerly of the National Intelligence Service commented at the families' committee inaugural meeting in 2008 that they were probably retained by North Korea specifically for their propaganda value. Oh Kil-nam, who defected to the North for a time in 1986, said that he met the two flight attendants as well as the Munhwa Broadcasting Corporation employees Hwang and Gim (see the list below) employed making propaganda broadcasts to the South and that later he heard from his daughter that the captain and first officer were working for the Korean People's Air Force. The flight attendant Seong Gyeong-hui's mother was allowed to visit the North in 2001 to see her daughter as part of the family reunions agreed to in the June 15th North–South Joint Declaration; there Seong said that she and the other flight attendant Jeong Gyeong-suk remained friends and were living in the same town.

Son of unreturned passenger Hwang Won, Hwang In-cheol, who was only 2 years old at the time of the hijacking, set up the Korean Air Flight YS-11 Families Committee in 2008 to press the South Korean government to further investigate the issue. In 2009, he stated that he felt particularly "alienated" by the mass media attention shown to the 2009 imprisonment of American journalists by North Korea lasting 141 days, compared to the relative lack of coverage of the fate of his father, also a journalist, whom he has not seen in 40 years. In June 2010, he applied to the Working Group on Enforced or Involuntary Disappearances of the United Nations Human Rights Council to investigate the unreturned passengers as cases of forced disappearance; he spent six months preparing the application, with the help of his friends. In February 2012, he filed a lawsuit against the North Korean spy who kidnapped his father.

The tail number of the aircraft, HL5208, was retired as a result of the incident.

List of unreturned passengers and crew
All four crew, as well as seven passengers, were not returned to the South. The ages listed are those as of the time of the hijacking.

Yu Byeong-ha (38) of Seoul, captain
Choe Seok-man (37) of Seoul, first officer
Jeong Gyeong-suk (24) of Seoul, flight attendant
Seong Gyeong-hui (23) of Seoul, flight attendant
Yi Dong-gi (49) of Miryang, manager of a printing company
Hwang Won (32) of Gangneung, programme director at Munhwa Broadcasting Corporation (MBC)
Gim Bongju (27) of Gangneung, cameraman at MBC
Chae Heon-deok (37) of Gangneung, doctor
Im Cheol-su (49) of Yanggu, office worker
Jang Ki-yeong (40) of Uijeongbu, food industry businessman
Choe Jeong-ung (28) of Wonju, Hankook Slate Company employee

References

Terrorist incidents in Asia in 1969
1969 crimes in South Korea
1969 in North Korea
Aircraft hijackings
Aviation accidents and incidents in 1969
Aviation accidents and incidents in South Korea
Hijacking
Terrorist incidents in South Korea
Kidnappings in South Korea
Terrorism committed by North Korea
North Korea–South Korea relations
Accidents and incidents involving the NAMC YS-11
December 1969 events in Asia